The 2001 Croatian Figure Skating Championships ( were the National Championships of the 2000–01 figure skating season. Skaters competed in the disciplines of men's singles, ladies' singles, and Ice dancing.

Senior results

Men

Ladies

Ice dance

Junior results

Ladies

External links
 results

Croatian Figure Skating Championships
2000 in figure skating
Croatian Figure Skating Championships, 2001